Apache Yetus is a collection of libraries and tools that enable contribution and release processes for software projects. Portions are used by a wide variety of Apache projects, including Apache Hadoop and Apache HBase.

It consists of the following components:
 Precommit - Module-based patch and full build testing
 Release Doc Maker  - Generates Markdown formatted changelog and release notes from JIRA
 Shelldocs - Markdown formatted documentation for Bash functions
 Audience Annotations - Java annotations that provide stability and audience information for APIs

References

External links
Yetus  project home page
Yetus mailing list archives

Java (programming language) libraries
Yetus
Static program analysis tools